Mavelikara Lok Sabha constituency is one of the 20 Lok Sabha (parliamentary) constituencies in Kerala state in southern India.

Assembly segments

Mavelikkara Lok Sabha constituency is composed of the following assembly regions:

Members of parliament

As Thiruvalla

As Mavelikara

Election results

General election 2019

General election 2014

See also
 Mavelikara
 List of Constituencies of the Lok Sabha
 Indian general election, 2014 (Kerala)
 2014 Indian general election

References

External links
 Election Commission of India: https://web.archive.org/web/20081218010942/http://www.eci.gov.in/StatisticalReports/ElectionStatistics.asp
 2019 General Election Mavelikkara Constituency Live Results
Mavelikkara Lok Sabha Elections Asianet News survey results 2019

Lok Sabha constituencies in Kerala
Politics of Alappuzha district